Maxim Potîrniche (born 13 June 1989) is a footballer who plays as a defender. He currently plays for Petrocub Hîncești.

Club career

FC Academia
In 2008 Maxim Potîrniche signed for his home town club, Moldovan outfit FC Academia, where he made 23 appearances in his first season.

International career
On 10 August 2011 Potîrniche made his debut for the Moldova national football team in a friendly match against Cyprus.

Personal life
Maxim Potîrniche declares himself Romanian and supports the reunification of Moldova and Romania.

References

External links

1989 births
Living people
Footballers from Chișinău
Moldovan footballers
Association football defenders
Moldova international footballers
Moldovan expatriate footballers
Expatriate footballers in Belarus
Expatriate footballers in Poland
FC Academia Chișinău players
FC Belshina Bobruisk players
FC Iskra-Stal players
FC Zimbru Chișinău players
FC Sheriff Tiraspol players
Moldovan Super Liga players
CS Petrocub Hîncești players